Dyakovo is a rural locality (a village) in Yurovskoye Rural Settlement, Gryazovetsky District, Vologda Oblast, Russia. It had a population of 3 as of 2002.

Geography 
Dyakovo is located 17 km west of Gryazovets (the district's administrative centre) by road. Skorodumka is the nearest rural locality.

References 

Rural localities in Gryazovetsky District